Ellis Gibbs Arnall (March 20, 1907December 13, 1992) was an American politician who served as the 69th Governor of Georgia from 1943 to 1947. A liberal Democrat, he helped lead efforts to abolish the poll tax and to reduce Georgia's voting age to 18. Following his departure from office, he became a highly successful attorney and businessman.

Education
Born in Newnan, Georgia, he attended Mercer University in Macon, Georgia, then graduated from the University of the South, and then from the University of Georgia School of Law.  He was admitted to the practice of law in 1931.  While attending Mercer University, Arnall was initiated into Kappa Alpha Order.

Early career
In 1932, Coweta County voters elected Arnall to the Georgia House of Representatives. Arnall was elected Speaker Pro Tempore, the second highest officer position in the Georgia House. Governor Eurith D. Rivers appointed Arnall, then 31, to a vacancy in the office of state attorney general.

In 1935, he married Mildred Slemons, whom he met at a friend's wedding. The two were happily married until her death in 1980, and they often showed their physical affection in public. Although Mildred Arnall was not particularly fond of politics and stayed out of the political arena, she stood by her husband throughout his career and encouraged him to succeed at whatever he did.

Governor

Actions undertaken by Governor Eugene Talmadge had caused the state's colleges to lose accreditation. Arnall unseated Talmadge in the 1942 primary, 174,757 (57.7 percent) to 128,394 (42.4 percent). Without Republican opposition, Arnall became the youngest governor then serving in the United States.

Arnall obtained the repeal of the poll tax, ratification in 1945 of a new state constitution, and a state employee merit system. He also retired the Georgia state debt. When young men were drafted into the armed forces during World War II, Arnall argued that youths old enough to fight in war should be able to vote for their country's leadership. He succeeded in lowering the voting age to eighteen more than two decades before the 26th Amendment to the United States Constitution implemented that change nationally. Georgia thus became the first state to grant the franchise to 18-year-olds. Arnall also removed the prison system from under the governor's direct control, establishing a board of corrections to oversee state prisons and a pardon and parole board to handle such requests. He removed the University of Georgia from political machinations, and he led efforts to prevent a governor from exercising dictatorial powers, as opponents of Governor Eugene Talmadge had allegedly stated, had occurred during that administration. Arnall's reforms won him attention from the national press. Additionally, Arnall, a proponent of civil rights, argued that African Americans should be able to vote in the state's primary election.

Re-election attempt

His career declined as he was unable to persuade the legislature to allow him to seek re-election. Arnall stood behind Henry A. Wallace's efforts to remain Vice President in 1944, when the former United States Secretary of Agriculture was replaced by U.S. Senator Harry S. Truman of Missouri. Arnall adhered to the United States Supreme Court decision banning the all-white Democratic party primary in the case Smith v. Allwright and hence opened the crucial Democratic primary elections to African Americans. This move particularly enraged Talmadge and his supporters, who used the issue to brand Arnall a 'race-traitor'.

Eugene Talmadge was elected governor once again in 1946 over James V. Carmichael (who was supported by Arnall) and another former governor, Eurith D. Rivers. However, he died a month before he was scheduled to take office in January 1947. The state legislature then elected Talmadge's son, Herman Talmadge, as governor. Arnall refused to resign the office during the controversy, and the younger Talmadge ended up locking Arnall out of his office in the state capitol. Arnall soon endorsed Melvin E. Thompson's unsuccessful claim to the office.

Later career
After leaving office, Arnall worked as an attorney and a businessman in Atlanta, founding Arnall Golden & Gregory (now Arnall Golden Gregory LLP), which continues to be one of Atlanta's leading law firms. One of his law partners was later U.S. Representative Elliott Levitas. Arnall served in the Truman administration for a short time as Director of the Office of Price Stabilization. Truman offered Arnall the post of Solicitor General but he declined in order to return to private practice. His business career made him a multimillionaire, and he was able to live comfortably for most of his life.

1966 election
Arnall's last campaign was for governor in 1966. His primary opponents for the nomination were Lester Maddox, an Atlanta restaurant owner who had hoisted ax handles as a symbol of his opposition to desegregation, and Jimmy Carter. Maddox called Arnall  "the granddaddy of forced racial integration ... a candidate who would never raise his voice or a finger - much less an ax handle - to protect the liberty of Georgia." Arnall practically ignored Maddox and concentrated his fire on Republican Howard Callaway, on whom Arnall had compiled a dossier that he said would guarantee Republican defeat in the general election. Arnall won a plurality of the vote in the primary but was denied the required majority, because of support for Carter, then a state senator representing Plains, Georgia. Arnall barely campaigned in the runoff, and the result was a surprising victory for Maddox. Carter had refused to endorse Arnall, but he formally supported Maddox in the general election against Callaway.

Maddox defeated Arnall in the runoff, 443,055 to 373,004. The civil rights activist Martin Luther King Jr., denounced what he called "a corroding cancer in the Georgia body politic. Georgia is a sick state produced by the diseases of a sick nation. This election revealed that Georgia is desperately competing with Mississippi for the bottom." Mayor Ivan Allen, Jr., of Atlanta, who once worked for Arnall's law firm, blamed Arnall's loss on the "combined forces of ignorance, prejudice, reactionism, and the duplicity of many Republican voters," many of whom are believed to have voted for Maddox in the Democratic runoff on the theory that Maddox would be a weaker opponent for Callaway than Arnall would have been.

Stunned Arnall backers announced a write-in candidacy for the general election, a move that impacted Callaway more than it did Maddox. In the general election, Callaway finished in the tabulation with a slight plurality over Maddox. Arnall received more than 69,000 write-in ballots, far exceeding the margin between Callaway and Maddox. Arnall actually carried one county, Liberty County in the southeastern portion of the state. Under the election rules then in effect, the state legislature was required to select a governor from the two candidates with the highest number of votes. Despite court challenges, the Democratic-dominated legislature overwhelmingly voted for Maddox, who became governor in 1967.

After the 1966 campaign, Arnall never again sought public office.

Arnall was an active Civitan.

He wrote the 1946 book, The Shore Dimly Seen (J. B. Lippincott & Co.), about politics and challenges of the South.

Death and legacy

Harold Paulk Henderson published the 1991 biography, The Politics of Change in Georgia: A Political Biography of Ellis Arnall.

He died in 1992 on his large estate. He was worth tens of millions of dollars at the time of his death. In 1997, Arnall was honored with a statue on the grounds of the Georgia State Capitol.

Arnall is interred at the Oak Hill Cemetery in his native Newnan.

Arnall Middle School in Newnan is named after him.

Notes

References

External links

 Obituary in The New York Times (December 15, 1992)
 Profile page for Ellis Gibbs Arnall on the National Governors Association web site

Oral History (1985–86), Georgia's Political Heritage Project, Dr. Mel Steely, Director; University of West Georgia 
 Governor Ellis Gibbs Arnall historical marker

Arnall, Ellis
1992 deaths
Georgia (U.S. state) Attorneys General
Georgia (U.S. state) lawyers
Democratic Party governors of Georgia (U.S. state)
Democratic Party members of the Georgia House of Representatives
People from Newnan, Georgia
University of Georgia alumni
20th-century American lawyers
20th-century American politicians
Writers from Georgia (U.S. state)